The Balkan Masters Athletics Championships is an annual international athletics competition between masters athletes aged 35 and over from nations in the Balkans. It is typically held over two or three days in September. It features a full programme of track and field events, plus a half marathon. Organised by Balkan Masters Athletics, it was first held in 1991 and has been held every year since. The competition was the organisation's first regular championships, and was followed by a Balkan Masters Cross Country Championships in 2007 and a Balkan Masters Indoor Athletics Championships in 2015.

Nations

Editions

Outdoor

2020 not held.

Indoor
  21-22/2/2015, Istanbul, TURKEY
  12-13/3/2016, Bucharest, ROMANIA
  10-11/3/2018, Belgrade, SERBIA
  02-03/03/2019, Istanbul, TURKEY
  07-08/03/2020, Belgrade, SERBIA
  12-13/03/2022, Novo Mesto, SLOVENIA

Cross Country
 15/4/2007, Smendarevo, SERBIA
 2008, Plovdiv, BULGARIA
 5/4/2009, Tirana, ALBANIA
 2010, Istanbul, TURKEY
 29/4/2012, Belgrade, SERBIA
 14/4/2013, Athens, GREECE
 13/4/2014, Bucharest, ROMANIA
 12/3/2016, Bucharest, ROMANIA

Medals
Source:

Outdoor
1991-2022:

30th Albania 2021:

Indoor
2015-2018:

Cross Country

References

External links
 Balkan Masters Athletics official website 
 Balkan Masters Athletics Website
 Medal Ranking

 
Masters athletics (track and field) competitions
Recurring sporting events established in 1991
Athletics competitions in Europe
Sport in the Balkans
Annual sporting events
September sporting events
1991 establishments in Europe